is a two genre Platformer and side-scrolling arcade video game produced by Technos in 1986. It was licensed for release outside of Japan by Taito. In the USA, the game was published by Memetron, and the game was renamed to Solar Warrior. The European home computer ports renamed the game to Soldier of Light.

Gameplay
The main character, Xain, is a galactic bounty-hunter who must defeat evil forces who oppress five different planets. The player can select any order to play the various planets, so, there is no 'official' sequence of play (For the U.S. version, this game was released as 'Solar Warrior'.  This version goes through a set sequence instead of having to choose planets).

Each planet is played with right horizontal and vertical scrolling, shooting enemies and dodging natural hazards. Xain can crouch, double crouch (prone), jump and double jump. In some of the planets the player will need to kill a sub-boss to resume. Certain enemies carry a powerup which changes the default laser gun into a different weapon. The different weapons which are cycled through powerups include a laser-grenade gun, a 2-way gun, a spreadfire gun and a strong bullet gun with their own respective damage and directional firing capabilities.

At the end of the planet, the player goes into battle with a boss. Once defeated, the player plants a bomb into the boss' base and has ten seconds to escape in a starship.

The next half of the planet stage is an interlude stage during which the player must battle through waves of enemy ships while heading to the next planet. After three planets there is a battle through an asteroid field and against a giant mothership.

When all five planets are liberated, the player will play the longer final stage on a gigantic metallic fortress, facing the bosses previously met on each of the five planets. Fighting bosses in this stage is optional. Halfway through the stage the player plants a bomb on the fortress core and has 60 seconds to reach the exit hangar and jump into the starship.

Reception

In Japan, Game Machine listed Xain'd Sleena on their January 15, 1987 issue as being the twelfth most-successful table arcade unit of the month.

While giving the Commodore 64 port a score of 499 points, ACE compared the game to Firebird's game Crosswize. The Games Machine gave the Atari ST, Commodore 64 and ZX Spectrum ports scores of 70%, 77% and 86% respectively.

References

External links

1986 video games
Amiga games
Arcade video games
Atari ST games
Commodore 64 games
MSX games
Scrolling shooters
Technōs Japan games
Video games with cross-platform play
ZX Spectrum games
Taito arcade games
Video games developed in Japan